St. Andrew is a subway station on Line 1 Yonge–University in Toronto, Ontario, Canada. It is located under University Avenue where it is intersected by King Street West. The station, which opened in 1963, is named for the nearby St. Andrew's Presbyterian Church. Wi-Fi service is available at this station.

Subway infrastructure in the vicinity
South of the station the line curves 90 degrees east to run under Front Street to Union station.

Nearby landmarks
The station is near the Entertainment District, including Roy Thomson Hall, Royal Alexandra Theatre, Princess of Wales Theatre and Bell Lightbox, the home of the Toronto International Film Festival. Also nearby is the Financial District and the Toronto Stock Exchange, with access east of the station via the PATH pedestrian tunnel system to Sun Life Centre, Exchange Tower, First Canadian Place, Standard Life Centre, and Toronto-Dominion Centre. Destinations west of the station, also available via PATH, include Metro Hall, Canadian Broadcasting Centre, RBC Centre, Ritz-Carlton Toronto and Simcoe Place, and continuing further to the Metro Toronto Convention Centre on the south side of Front Street.

Surface connections 

A transfer is required to connect between the subway and these surface TTC streetcar routes:

TTC routes serving the station include:

Station improvements
 
Starting in 2008, several minor improvements to the station were implemented. A trial installation of LED lights at the south end of the platform was being used to study their effectiveness in the system. The decision to keep them was made in September 2009, and permanent installation began in February 2011.

Removal of the metal slat wall cover treatment began in 2009. In June 2009, the installation of a new wall treatment began. The new treatment consisted of enamel-painted sheet metal that was white with dark green trim and lettering. On March 25, 2010, the panels were replaced with new versions that showed less buckling; however, the buckling issue was not totally resolved and a new stronger version was being developed.

The station was converted to full wheelchair accessibility by adding a new elevator inside the station from the mezzanine level to the subway platform, and upgrading an elevator in a nearby office complex at 145 King St West to provide access from street level to the mezzanine. The project started in 2010 and the elevators went into service in June 2012.

References

External links 

Line 1 Yonge–University stations
PATH (Toronto)
Railway stations in Canada opened in 1963
1963 establishments in Ontario
Railway stations with vitreous enamel panels